Devarahosahalli is a village in the southern state of Karnataka, India. It is located in the Nelamangala taluk of Bangalore Rural district.

Demographics 
Devarahosahalli had population of 1,258 of which 631 are males while 627 are females as per report released by Census India 2011.

Geography 
The total geographical area of village is 316.43 hectares.

Bus Route from Bengaluru City 
Yeshwantapura  - Nelamangala - Dabaspete

See also 

 Halenijagal
 Bengaluru Rural District

References

External links 

Villages in Bangalore Rural district